The Kwangsi gecko (Gekko kwangsiensis) is a species of gecko. It is endemic to Guangxi Province in China.

References

Gekko
Reptiles described in 2015
Endemic fauna of Guangxi
Reptiles of China